Maarman is a surname. Notable people with the surname include:

Marzuq Maarman (born 1992), South African rugby union player
Tertius Maarman (born 1987), South African rugby union player